WWGA is a radio station airing a classic hits format licensed to Tallapoosa, Georgia, broadcasting on 98.9 MHz FM. The station serves the areas of Carrollton, Georgia, Bremen, Georgia and Heflin, Alabama, and is owned by WKNG, LLC.

References

External links

Classic hits radio stations in the United States
WGA